Anghel Saligny, known for a short time as Linia de Centură ("Ring Road"), is a metro station in southeastern Bucharest on Line M3. It is the final stop of the Preciziei – Anghel Saligny M3 extension. It was open on 20 November 2008 as part of the extension from Nicolae Grigorescu, which initially  operated as a shuttle. The regular operation started on 4 July 2009.

Originally planned to serve the large industrial estates in the area and replace the obsolete surface tram line, now it serves suburban commuters and students.

References

Bucharest Metro stations
Railway stations opened in 2008
2008 establishments in Romania